Anthony Moor (born 4 May 1993) is a Zimbabwean cricketer. He made his Twenty20 debut for Mid West Rhinos in the 2018–19 Stanbic Bank 20 Series on 11 March 2019.

References

External links
 

1993 births
Living people
Zimbabwean cricketers
Mid West Rhinos cricketers
Place of birth missing (living people)